Novonikolayevka is a rural locality (a selo) in Amaransky Selsoviet of Romnensky District, Amur Oblast, Russia. The population was 103 as of 2018. There is 1 street.

Geography 
Novonikolayevka is located 23 km east of Romny (the district's administrative centre) by road. Bratolyubovka is the nearest rural locality.

References 

Rural localities in Romnensky District